Horatio Vincent Lamar (July 11, 1911 – February 19, 1998) was an American Negro league second baseman in the 1930s.

A native of Augusta, Georgia, Lamar attended Morehouse College and played for the Indianapolis ABCs in 1939. He died in Augusta in 1998 at age 86.

References

External links
 and Seamheads

1911 births
1998 deaths
Atlanta Black Crackers players
Baseball second basemen
Baseball players from Augusta, Georgia
20th-century African-American sportspeople